Sans Pareil is a steam locomotive built by Timothy Hackworth which took part in the 1829 Rainhill Trials on the Liverpool and Manchester Railway, held to select a builder of locomotives.  The name is French and means 'peerless' or 'without equal'.

While a capable locomotive for the day, its technology was somewhat antiquated compared to George and Robert Stephenson's Rocket, the winner of the Rainhill Trials and the £500 prize money. Instead of the fire tube boiler of Rocket, Sans Pareil had a double return flue. To increase the heating surface area, the two flues were joined by  a U shaped tube at the forward end of the boiler; the firebox and chimney were both positioned at the same end, one on either side.

Sans Pareil had two cylinders, mounted vertically at the opposite end to the chimney, and driving one pair of driving wheels directly - the other pair were driven via connecting rods, in the typical steam locomotive fashion.

At the Rainhill Trials, Sans Pareil was excluded from the prize because it was slightly over the maximum permitted weight. Nevertheless, it performed very well but had a strange rolling gait due to its vertical cylinders. The 'blast' from the blastpipe was, in Hackworth's trademark style, very strong, so most of the coke was expelled out of the chimney unburnt; and it was this more than its antiquated design that caused its abysmal fuel economy . The manufacture of the cylinders had been contracted out to Robert Stephenson & Co. and Hackworth's supporters cried 'foul!', but as he had had over twenty cylinders cast, choosing the best two for the locomotive, skulduggery on the part of the Stephensons, and who were direct competitors at Rainhill, is unlikely. After the trials, the Liverpool and Manchester Railway bought Sans Pareil as well as Rocket. It was subsequently leased to the Bolton and Leigh Railway where it ran until 1844. It was then used by John Hargreaves as a stationary boiler at the Coppull Colliery, Chorley until 1863. Thereafter, Sans Pareil was restored and presented to the Patent Office Museum (which later became the Science Museum) in 1864 by John Hick. The engine now resides at the Shildon Locomotion Museum on static display.


Replica

A replica locomotive, built in 1980, is now preserved by the National Railway Museum at its new Shildon Locomotion Museum annex, which is also home to what remains of the original locomotive.

Other locomotives
London, Midland & Scottish Railway Royal Scot Class 4-6-0 locomotive 6126 was originally named Sans Pareil. This loco was built by the North British Locomotive Company at Glasgow in September 1927 and withdrawn in October 1963 as 46126 Royal Army Service Corps. An AL6 electric locomotive built at Doncaster Works in 1965, number E3106 (later numbered 86214) carried the name 'Sans Pareil' between 1981 and 2005. 86214 was scrapped in 2006.

References

External links 

 Sans Pareil

Individual locomotives of Great Britain
0-4-0 locomotives
English inventions
Rainhill Trials locomotives
Early steam locomotives
Steam locomotives of Great Britain
Liverpool and Manchester Railway locomotives